Steel is the soundtrack of the 1997 film of the same name. It was released just days before the film and featured the hit single "Men of Steel", a posse cut featuring Shaquille O'Neal, Ice Cube, B-Real, Peter Gunz, and KRS-One. The soundtrack reached #185 on the Billboard 200 and #26 on the top R&B/Hip-Hop charts. Other guests include Ray J., Mobb Deep, Blackstreet, Tevin Campbell and Spice 1. Kansas City rapper Tech N9ne had written and recorded a song for the film titled "Strange", but the song was not included.

Track listing
"Mobb of Steel" – 3:56 (Mobb Deep)
"No More Fighting" – 4:15 (Tevin Campbell)
"Strait Playin'" – 3:43 (Shaquille O'Neal)
"Breakout" – 3:59 (Jia)
"Anything for Your Love" – 4:15 (Jon B.)
"Free to Be Me" – 5:25 (Gina Breedlove)
"Men of Steel" – 4:35  (Shaquille O'Neal, Ice Cube, B-Real, Peter Gunz and KRS-One)
"We've Got Heart" – 3:54 (She)
"Coming Home to You" – 4:48 (Blackstreet)
"Nothing Compares" – 4:44 (Az Yet)
"Alone in the Crowd" – 5:02 (Maria Christina)
"Mind on My Money" – 3:31 (Spice 1)

Hip hop soundtracks
Soundtrack
1997 soundtrack albums
Albums produced by DJ Quik
Albums produced by G-One
Albums produced by Havoc (musician)
Albums produced by Teddy Riley
Warner Records soundtracks
Rhythm and blues soundtracks
Superhero film soundtracks